Miss Dominica Queen is a national Beauty pageant in Dominica.

History
Miss Dominica pageant was held for first time in 1978. Since that year Dominica made its mark in the Miss World competition and continued in 1985 competed in the Miss Universe competition.

Throughout history, carnival queens from the small island of Dominica have proven that they are a force to be reckoned with in Caribbean pageantry. The small nation island has received immense attention by its carnival queens. Marcella Larocque, Margarete Rose Cools-Latigue, Giesel Francis, Nakita Bruno, Leandra Lander, Marah Walter, Marcia Baptiste and Leslassa Armour-Shillingford. In 2013, the Miss Dominica Organization declared its return to the Miss World pageant in Jakarta, Indonesia. Miss Dominica 2013 - Leslassa Armour-Shillingford represented her country at the pageant and was selected as a finalist for the talent segment. 

Miss Dominica 2013 competed among other contestants from around the world in several categories, which spanned over the month. These categories included Beach Fashion, Top Model, Sports and Fitness, Beauty with a Purpose, Talent Competition and the World Fashion Designer Award.

International winners

Miss Caribbean Culture Queen
2017 — Jade Shari Romain
2013 — Leslassa Armour-Shillingford
2008 — Marah Walter
2007 — Leandra Lander

Miss Jaycees International
2016 — Tasia Floissac
2013 — Leslassa Armour-Shillingford
2012 — Nadira Lando
2010 — Marcia Baptiste
2008 — Marah Walter
2007 — Leandra Lander

Miss Carival
2014 — Francine Tiffany Baron
2013 — Leslassa Armour-Shillingford
2007 — Leandra Lander
2006 — Nakita Bruno

Miss Caribbean World
2012 — Nadira Lando
2010 — Marcia Baptiste
2008 — Marah Walter
2006 — Nakita Bruno
1997 — Giesel Francis-Allen

Miss OECS
1998 — Kamala Jno Baptiste

Miss Carifta
1973 — Esther Fadelle-Morris

Titleholders

References

External links
Official page on Facebook

 

Dominica
Dominica
Recurring events established in 1945
Dominica awards
Events in Dominica